Marathyssa inficita, the dark marathyssa, is a moth in the family Euteliidae. The species was first described by Francis Walker in 1865. It is found in North America.

The MONA or Hodges number for Marathyssa inficita is 8955.

Subspecies
It has two subspecies:
 Marathyssa inficita inficita
 Marathyssa inficita minus Dyar, 1921

References

Further reading

External links
 

Euteliinae
Articles created by Qbugbot
Moths described in 1865